The German destroyer D187 Rommel was one of three  guided-missile destroyers, a modified version of the American , built for the Bundesmarine (West German Navy) during the 1960s.

Design and description
The Charles F. Adams class was based on a stretched  hull modified to accommodate smaller RIM-24 Tartar surface-to-air missiles and all their associated equipment. They displaced  at full load. Their crew consisted of 333 officers and enlisted men.

The ships were equipped with two geared General Electric steam turbines, each driving one propeller shaft, using steam provided by four D-V2M water-tube boilers. Unlike their half-sisters, the ships had two macks.

They were armed with two 5"/54 caliber Mark 42 gun forward, one each forward and aft of the superstructure. The ships were fitted with an eight-round ASROC launcher between the funnels. Close-range anti-submarine defense was provided by two triple sets of  Mk 32 torpedo tubes. The primary armament of the ships was the Tartar surface-to-air missile designed to defend the carrier battle group. They were fired via the single-arm Mk 13 missile launcher and the ships stowed a total of 40 missiles for the launcher.

Construction and career
Rommel was laid down on 22 August 1967 by Bath Iron Works of Bath, Maine with the hull number DDG-30. She was launched on 1 February 1969, and christened Rommel by Lucie Maria Rommel, widow of Generalfeldmarschall Erwin Rommel. The vessel was commissioned on 2 May 1970, and was added to the 1. Zerstörergeschwader (first destroyer squadron), based in Kiel. She operated for 28 years.

On 30 September 1998, Rommel was decommissioned. The operating licence for the boilers had expired and it was not considered efficient to refit her. These two vessels continued to serve for five more years. In 2004 the hull of Rommel was scrapped in Turkey.

Notes

References

Lütjens-class destroyers
Ships built in Bath, Maine
1969 ships
Steam turbine-powered ships
Erwin Rommel